Diliana Méndez (born October 27, 1982 in Caracas, Distrito Capital) is a Venezuelan sport shooter.  She is also a member of Orion Practical Shooting Club in Maracay, Aragua, and is coached and trained by Boris Loginov.

Mendez represented Venezuela at the 2008 Summer Olympics in Beijing, where she competed for two rifle shooting events. She placed forty-third out of forty-seven shooters in the women's 10 m air rifle, with a total score of 386 points. Nearly a week later, Mendez competed for her second event, 50 m rifle 3 positions, where she was able to shoot 192 targets in a prone position, and 188 each in standing and in kneeling, for a total score of 568 points, finishing only in thirty-ninth place.

References

External links
NBC 2008 Olympics profile

Venezuelan female sport shooters
Living people
Olympic shooters of Venezuela
Shooters at the 2008 Summer Olympics
Sportspeople from Caracas
1982 births
Shooters at the 2015 Pan American Games
South American Games gold medalists for Venezuela
South American Games silver medalists for Venezuela
South American Games medalists in shooting
Competitors at the 2010 South American Games
Competitors at the 2014 South American Games
Pan American Games competitors for Venezuela
20th-century Venezuelan women
21st-century Venezuelan women